The East Rome Historic District, in Rome, Georgia, is a historic district which was listed on the National Register of Historic Places in 1985.

The district is mostly residential.  It is roughly bounded by Walnut Ave., McCall Blvd., E. 8th and 10th Streets in Rome.  It includes a commercial area around the intersection of East 8th and Second Avenue plus the northern end of Maple Avenue.  This area includes a two-story brick former fire station, a frame retail building, and some former residences now used commercially.  Another small commercial section is on Maple Avenue is by the railroad, around the former site of the depot; it includes brick buildings.

The residential architecture of the district includes Victorian, Queen Anne, Second Empire, Georgian Revival, Bungalow/Craftsman, and Period Styles. One of the most elaborate Victorian ones is the Colonel Hamilton
Yancey Residence in the Second Empire style.

References

National Register of Historic Places in Floyd County, Georgia
Historic districts on the National Register of Historic Places in Georgia (U.S. state)
Victorian architecture in Georgia (U.S. state)
Colonial Revival architecture in Georgia (U.S. state)